Echo TV (since February 15, 2002, also Ekho TV, Телекомпания «Эхо», Эхо-ТВ) is an television company. Echo TV is affiliated with Echo of Moscow radio station and RTVi satellite television network. The president is Alexei Venediktov.

References

External links 

Russian-language television stations
Television channels in Russia
RTVI
Echo of Moscow